All Wrapped Up in Christmas is the title of the first Christmas album released by American country music artist Tracy Lawrence. It was released in late 2007 on his own label, Rocky Comfort Records. The album's title track charted at #57 on Hot Country Songs in January 2008.

Track listing
"All Wrapped Up in Christmas" (Flip Anderson, Kenny Beard) – 2:07
"Winter Wonderland" (Felix Bernard, Dick Smith) – 2:45
"Let It Snow, Let It Snow, Let It Snow" (Sammy Cahn, Jule Styne) – 3:05
"Have Yourself a Merry Little Christmas" (Hugh Martin, Ralph Blane) – 4:44
"Here Comes Santa Claus" (Gene Autry, Oakley Haldeman) – 3:18
"Something in the Air" (Georgia McKearly, Phyllis Baratz Fishelder) – 3:40
"White Christmas" (Irving Berlin) – 3:15
"The Christmas Song" (Mel Tormé, Bob Wells) – 3:47
"Cold Beer" (Flip Anderson, John D. Loudermilk) – 3:54
"Frosty the Snowman" (Walter E. Rollins, Steve Nelson) – 2:09

Personnel
Eddie Bayers- drums
Joe Caverlee- fiddle
Paul Franklin- steel guitar
Wes Hightower- background vocals
Tracy Lawrence- lead vocals
B. James Lowry- acoustic guitar
Brent Mason- electric guitar
Steve Poole- piano
Glenn Worf- bass guitar

References

2007 Christmas albums
Tracy Lawrence albums
Albums produced by Julian King (recording engineer)
Christmas albums by American artists
Country Christmas albums